Theal is a 2022 Indian Tamil-language action film, an adaptation of the 2012 South Korean film Pietà, written and directed by Harikumar in his directorial debut  and produced by K. E. Gnanavel Raja of Studio Green. The film stars Prabhu Deva and Samyuktha Hegde, with Easwari Rao, Yogi Babu, Shatru and Arjai in supporting roles. The film's music and score is composed by C. Sathya, with cinematography handled by Vignesh Vasu and editing done by Praveen K. L. 

The film was released in theatres on 14 January 2022.

Synopsis 
Durai works as a ruthless, cold-hearted henchman to one such loan shark named Paulraj. All is fine for Durai until a woman barges into his house and claims that she is his mother. This sends Dorai's reality into a spiral, and what happened next makes the rest of the story.

Cast

Music 
The film's soundtrack is composed by C. Sathya. This is the first  collaboration for him with Prabhu Deva and Harikumar. The soundtrack album featured four songs written by Viveka, Uma Devi, Lavarthan and Kiruthiyaa. The audio rights were acquired by Think Music.

Release

Theatrical 
The film was initially planned for release in theatres on 10 December 2021, but got postponed due to unforeseen situations. It was later scheduled for 14 January 2022, Pongal festival.

Home media
The satellite rights of the film were bagged by Star Network television rights of the film were sold to Star Vijay and digital streaming rights were acquired by Disney+ Hotstar respectively.

Reception 
M. Suganth of The Times of India said, "Theal is a surprisingly effective drama that is well-made with performances that hold our attention. Yes, much of the film's emotional impact comes from the writing, [...] but the filmmaking is also solid enough".Maalai Malar critic noted that "Director Harikumar has directed the film focusing on mother and son affection. The film did not attract many fans as it was thought that only affection was enough."Dinamalar critic gave mixture of Review ,said that "They thought that only mother sentiment will save the film. That's not enough, it's true" and gave 2.5 out of 5 stars

References

External links 
 

2022 directorial debut films
Films scored by C. Sathya
Indian action films
Indian remakes of South Korean films
Maternity in India
Films about mother–son relationships
2022 action films